The Dominican Republic has gone through 39 constitutions, more than any other country, since its independence in 1844. This statistic is a somewhat deceiving indicator of political stability, however, because of the Dominican practice of promulgating a new constitution whenever an amendment is ratified. Although technically different from each other in some particular provisions, most new constitutions contained only minor modifications of those previously in effect. Sweeping constitutional innovations were relatively rare.

A large number of constitutions do, however, reflect a fundamental lack of consensus on the rules that should govern the national political life. Most Dominican governments felt compelled upon taking office to write new constitutions that changed the rules to fit their own wishes. Not only did successive governments often strenuously disagree with their predecessors' policies and programs, but they often wholly rejected the institutional framework within which their predecessors had operated. Constitutionalism—loyalty to a stable set of governing principles and laws rather than to the person who promulgates them—became a matter of overriding importance in the Dominican Republic only after the death of Rafael Trujillo.

Dominicans historically had agreed that government should be representative and vaguely democratic, that there should be civil and political rights, separation of powers, and checks and balances. Beyond that, however, consensus broke down. The country had been alternately dominated throughout its history by two constitutional traditions, one relatively democratic and the other authoritarian. Rarely were there attempts to bridge the gap between these diametric opposites.

The current Constitution was promulgated on June 13, 2015.

Constitutions through Trujillo
The first Dominican constitution was promulgated on November 6, 1844, immediately after the nation achieved independence from Haiti. It was a liberal document with many familiar elements—separation of powers, checks and balances, and a long list of basic rights. However, an authoritarian government replaced the country's liberal, democratic government during its first year. The new regime proceeded to write its own constitution. This second constitution considerably strengthened the executive, weakened the legislative and judicial branches, and gave the president widespread emergency powers, including the power to suspend basic rights and to rule by decree. After that, the country's governance often alternated between liberal and authoritarian constitutional systems.

Even the dictator Rafael Trujillo always operated under the banner of constitutionalism. Under Trujillo, however, the legislature was simply a rubber stamp; the courts were not independent, and basic rights ceased to exist. He governed as a tyrant, unfettered by constitutional restrictions.

Constitutions after Trujillo
After Trujillo died in 1961, the constitution was amended to provide for new elections and to allow the transfer of power to an interim Council of State. Although promulgated as a new document, the 1962 constitution was a continuation of the Trujillo constitution, and it was thus unpopular.

In 1964, Juan Bosch's freely elected, social-democratic government drafted a new and far more liberal constitution. It separated church and state, put severe limits on the political activities of the armed forces, established a wide range of civil liberties, and restricted the rights of property relative to individual rights. These provisions frightened the more conservative elements in Dominican society, which banded together to oust Bosch and his constitution in September 1963. Subsequently, the more conservative 1962 constitution was restored. In the name of constitutionalism, Bosch and his followers launched a revolution in 1965, the objective of which was the restoration of the liberal 1963 constitution.

Largely due to the United States military intervention of April 1965, the civil war had died down by 1966. With Joaquín Balaguer and his party in control, the Dominicans wrote still another constitution. This one was intended to avert the conflicts and polarization of the past by combining features from both the liberal and the conservative traditions. The 1966 Constitution incorporated a long list of basic rights and provided a strengthened legislature; however, it also gave extensive powers to the executive, including emergency powers. In this way, the country sought to bridge the gap between its democratic and authoritarian constitutions by compromising their differences.

Later constitutions were enacted in 1994 and 2002.

Constitution of 2010 
President Leonel Fernández ordered for a new constitution to be drafted. The constitution has faced notable criticism, both abroad and at home, with opponents referring to it as an "injustice" and as a "step backward" for ensuring human rights in the country, especially towards women and homosexuals. A ban on same-sex marriage and abortion (Article 55) was included at the behest of the Roman Catholic Church and Evangelical Christians. As a result, the Dominican Republic has become the fifth jurisdiction in the world with a complete (no exceptions) ban on abortion (Malta, El Salvador, Nicaragua, and Vatican City).

Constitution Day 
Until 2011, a public holiday was held to commemorate Constitution Day on November 6. Since then, it has been held on the closest Monday to that date to ensure a three-day weekend. In 2020, it fell on November 9. In 2021, it fell on November 8. It will occur on these days in coming years:

 2022: November 7
 2023: November 6
 2024: November 4
 2025: November 3

See also
 Constitutional law
 Constitutional economics

References

Further reading
2015 Constitution in English
2015 Constitution in Spanish

External links
2015 Constitution 
2010 Constitution in English 
1994 Constitution 
2002 Constitution 
 

Government of the Dominican Republic
Dominican Republic